Muhieddine Jaroudi was a Lebanese footballer who played as an forward.

A player for Riyadi Beirut, Nahda, Hilmi-Sport, and Racing Beirut, Jaroudi took part in Lebanon's first international match against Mandatory Palestine in 1940, assisting Lebanon's lone goal of the game.

References

External links
 

Year of birth missing
Year of death missing
Association football forwards
Association football outside forwards
Lebanese footballers
Al Riyadi Club Beirut footballers
Al Nahda SC players
AS Hilmi-Sport players
Racing Club Beirut players
Lebanese Premier League players
Lebanon international footballers